Schandmaul is a German medieval folk rock band from the Munich area.

As well as using modern instruments such as the bass and electric guitar, the band also utilizes instruments typically used in Medieval folk songs such as the bagpipes, hurdy-gurdy or shawm, to produce their trademark folk rock sound. Schandmaul was nominated two times for the Echo Music Prize and has so far had six albums in the top ten German album charts and three top-ten albums in Austria.

The name 'Schandmaul' translates roughly to 'evil tongue' and refers to their mascot of a grinning skeletal jester.

History 
Schandmaul was founded in the summer of 1998 when six musicians from Munich and the surrounding area, then members of different bands, came together for a folk rock concert. They were dissatisfied with performing nothing but cover-versions and so decided to write a few songs of their own for the event. The very first song written by the newly formed band, Teufelsweib (lit. Devil-Woman), already exhibited the sound that, cultivated and developed over the years, is considered typical for Schandmaul.

The first concert took place in the bar 'Die Hexe' (lit. 'The Witch') in Gröbenzell. The self-deprecating name 'Schandmaul' was chosen to be used by the band at the event, inspired by a jester from a deck of cards. The jester is viewed as a fool, but this indignity gains him the privilege to speak his mind freely, and accordingly, the outdated swear word 'Schandmaul' refers to somebody who frequently says things considered rude or outrageous.

The success of the concert spawned their desire to produce a CD, which was to be the self-produced album Wahre Helden (lit. True Heroes).

Their abundance of creative energy inspired more songs and a second album, titled Von Spitzbuben und anderen Halunken (lit. Of Rogues and Other Scoundrels), was released in 2000. That same year, the band signed with concert promoter Extratours, who has been responsible for the band's live shows ever since.

In 2001, record label 'F.A.M.E. recordings' took notice of the band, leading to the re-release of Von Spitzbuben und anderen Halunken. Simultaneously, through numerous shows including big festivals like M'era Luna, the Zillo Festival and Wave-Gotik-Treffen, the first big tour came about. The third CD, Narrenkönig (lit. King of the Jester's) was recorded in a professional studio and was released in October 2002, reaching No. 70 on the charts. In September 2002, the band parted ways with bassist Hubsi Widman, who was replaced by Matthias Richter who debuted on 22 September 2002 in Meschede.

In 2003 the first live CD and DVD, Hexenkessel (lit. Witch's Cauldron, also meaning the proverbial 'boiling pot') were released, recorded during a concert in the Munich club New Backstage, at which Michael Rhein from In Extremo made a cameo appearance as guest singer. Hexenkessel reached No. 52 in the charts.

In early 2004, Wie Pech & Schwefel (lit. Like Pitch and Sulphur, German idiom with a similar meaning to "as thick as thieves") appeared in the stores. This first studio album with Matthias Richter reached No. 13 in the charts. A tour with over 80 concerts and shows throughout German-speaking Europe followed. At the end of 2004, the band organized the first ever Funkenflug festival in Munich. The following year, the biggest project yet in the band's history was created: An acoustic tour, where the electric guitars were replaced by a string quartet and extra percussion, capped off by a huge concert in Munich's Circus Krone Building, accompanied by the Puchheimer Jugendkammerorchester (a 50 piece orchestra) and helped out by numerous musicians from other bands, such as Castus and Wim from Corvus Corax on bag pipes and Oliver s. Tyr from Faun on the Celtic harp (who had recently teamed up with Birgit to create a folk project called Sava). This huge show was recorded and released as both a CD and DVD under the name "Kunststück" (lit. Feat). The CD reached No. 12 in the album charts and the DVD made it to No. 3 in the video charts having sold 25,000 copies as of 2011. A single called "Bin Unterwegs" (lit. "(I) Am on the way") was also produced based on the live recording from Circus Krone. More shows followed, partially with the strings but including the rock set, and a cooperation-agreement with the Deutschen Zentrum für Musiktherapie (German Centre for Music Therapy) was created.

In March 2006 another album appeared, titled Mit Leib und Seele (lit. Body and Soul). This became the first Schandmaul album to reach the top ten of Germany's Media Control charts.

Schandmaul's sixth album Anderswelt (lit. meaning "Other-world") appeared in April 2008. It reached a position of No. 8 in Media Control's album charts in its first week and remained in their Top 100 for fifteen weeks. This success has since been topped by their 2011 album, Traumtänzer.

In November 2008, Schandmaul celebrated their 10th anniversary with a widely promoted anniversary concert in Munich that was filmed and recorded for the live CD and DVD Sinnfonie (word play on the words Sinn, sense, and Sinfonie, symphony).

In early 2009, Schandmaul were nominated for the German music award ECHO.

A club tour that was originally planned for 2010 was cancelled and no concerts were played that year as the band wanted a break to write new material.

This album, Traumtänzer (lit. dream dancer), was released on 28 January 2011 and was followed by a short spring tour and appearances at festivals in the summer of 2011. The album reached a position of No. 4 in the German Media Control album charts

The eighth studio album Unendlich (lit. infinite) was released on 24 January 2014 by Universal Records. Unendlich peaked at position 2 in the German charts, making it the most successful Schandmaul album yet. It was nominated for the 2014 ECHO award. Unendlich was certified gold status in Germany for 100,000 sold copies.

The album LeuchtFeuer (lit. light beacons or navigational light) was released on 16 September 2016. It entered the German album charts a week later and was immediately listed at position No. 1. It is Schandmaul's first album to reach the top position in the charts. The band was accompanied by Tarja Turunen on the track Zu zweit allein.

On the 2nd September 2020 they signed a record deal with Napalm Records.

Discography

Studio albums

Live albums

Compilations

EPs

DVDs 
 Hexenkessel (2003)
 Kunststück (2005), certified gold status in 2011 for 25,000 sold copies
 Sinnbilder (2008)
 Sinnfonie (2009)

Awards and nominations

|-
| style="text-align:center;"|2000
| style="text-align:left;"|Schandmaul
| style="text-align:left;"|German Folk Music Sponsorship Award (Deutscher Folkförderpreis)
| 
|-
| style="text-align:center;"|2007
| style="text-align:left;"|Schandmaul's own project for the promotion of upcoming bands
| style="text-align:left;"|Pick Up Bavarian Rock Prize (Bayerischer Rockpreis Pick Up)
|
|-
| style="text-align:center;"|2009
| style="text-align:left;"|Anderswelt
| style="text-align:left;"|ECHO
|
|-
| style="text-align:center;"|2014
| style="text-align:left;"|Unendlich
| style="text-align:left;"|ECHO
|

Members

Current members
 Thomas Lindner – vocals, acoustic guitar, accordion
 Birgit Muggenthaler-Schmack – flutes, shawms, bagpipe, vocals
 Martin "Ducky" Duckstein – electric guitar, acoustic guitar, classical guitar, vocals
 Stefan Brunner – drums, percussion, vocals
 Matthias Richter – bass, upright bass (since 2002)
 Saskia Forkert – violin, hurdy-gurdy, backing vocals (since 2018)

The four male band members also play in the rock band Weto with Regicide keyboarder Heiner Jaspers, while Birgit Muggenthaler-Schmack and Anna Kränzlein both cultivate their own side projects, Sava and Anna Katharina respectively.

Former members
 Hubsi Widmann – bass, mandolin, hurdy-gurdy, vocals (1998–2002)
 Anna Kränzlein – violin, hurdy-gurdy, vocals (1998–2017)

References

External links

 Official Schandmaul website

German folk metal musical groups
Medieval folk rock groups
Universal Records artists